"Hitchin' a Ride" is a song written by Mitch Murray and Peter Callander issued as a single by the English pop/rock band Vanity Fare in late 1969. It reached number 16 on the UK Singles Chart in February 1970 but was a bigger hit in the United States, reaching number 5 on the Hot 100 on June 27, 1970. Billboard ranked the record as the number 14 song of 1970.  In Chicago, the record achieved even greater heights, topping the WCFL Big 10 Countdown on 18–25 May 1970, ranking #4 for all of 1970 and ranking #12 on rival WLS Radio 89 Hit Parade on 6 July 1970, ranking #10 for all of 1970. "Hitchin' a Ride" sold a million copies in the United States alone, and it became a gold record.

Background
The song is about a young man who is attempting to hitchhike since he has no money. The song is noted for its two recorders first heard in the introduction as well as in the sections between the choruses and the verses.

The song is also noted for its instrumental section, featuring an electric piano, that plays a bass line in repetition, which is accompanied by the piano's upper register, bass, drums, and guitar, which is later heard before the song's fade. The U.S. single edit shortens the ending by eliminating the final repeated lines of "ride, ride" before the song fades out.

Chart performance (Vanity Fare)

Weekly charts

Year-end charts

Sinitta version

"Hitchin' a Ride" was covered by American singer Sinitta. It was released in 1990 as the fifth and final single from her second album Wicked (1989). The song was produced by Ralf Rene Maue. The B-side contains a previously unreleased song "I'm On My Way". This single reached number 24 in the UK, number 19 in Ireland, and number 131 in Australia.

Critical reception
Bill Coleman from Billboard wrote, "U.K. siren continues her bid for American stardom with a peppy, HiNRG cover of the Vanity Fare nugget." David Giles from Music Week stated that the song has been "given an ultra-glossy Hi-NRG sheen". He added that "it sounds a little dated, reminiscent perhaps of Kelly Marie's "Feels Like I'm in Love", but should still clear the shelves."

Formats and track listings
7" single
"Hitchin' a Ride" – 3:42
"I'm on My Way" – 3:52
12" single
"Hitchin' a Ride" (extended version) – 6:35
"I'm on My Way" – 3:52
CD single
"Hitchin' a Ride" (extended version) – 6:35
"I'm on My Way" – 3:52
"Hitchin' a Ride" – 3:42

Charts

Other cover versions
 A country music version of the song was released by singer, Jack Reno and reached #12 on the U.S. country chart in 1971.
 British group Paper Lace adapted their 1974 version as "Hitchin' a Ride '75", reaching #55 on the official UK "Breakers List" chart and #16 in New Zealand.
 A 1986 recording by The Replacements is featured on the 2017 live album For Sale: Live at Maxwell's 1986.

See also
Hitch hike (dance)

References

External links
[ Vanity Fare biography] at Allmusic website
 
 

1969 singles
1970 singles
1975 singles
1990 singles
Vanity Fare songs
Paper Lace songs
Jack Reno songs
Sinitta songs
Songs written by Mitch Murray
Songs written by Peter Callander
1969 songs
Fanfare Records singles
Philips Records singles